Cregagh Cricket Club is a cricket club in Belfast, Northern Ireland, playing in the Premier League of the NCU Senior League. It shares a ground with Orangefield Old Boys F.C.

Honours
NCU Senior League: 2
1945, 1947
NCU Junior Cup: ‡2
†1934, 1936

‡ 1 by 2nd XI
† Won by 2nd XI

References

External links
Cregagh Cricket Club

Sports clubs in Belfast
Cricket clubs in Northern Ireland
NCU Senior League members
Cricket clubs in County Down